Rufrius Crispinus was an equestrian who lived during the later Julio-Claudian dynasty. Under the Roman Emperor Claudius he was the commander of the Praetorian Guard. In 47, he suppressed a rebellion and was promoted by the Senate to the rank of praetor and was given one and half a million sesterces.

In AD 51, the Empress Agrippina the Younger removed him from his command position and replaced him with Sextus Afranius Burrus. She regarded Crispinus as loyal to Messalina's memory.

Crispinus married Poppaea Sabina, who would later become Empress (also Nero's second wife) and would bear him a son of the same name. They divorced, and Poppaea married Otho, whom she also divorced, going on to marry the Emperor Nero.

Crispinus later became a member of the Roman Senate, due to property qualifications and enjoyed senatorial status. Martial passingly mentions his purple cloak suiting his complexion. In 65, due to Nero's hatred for him, he was banished. One year later, Nero ordered his execution.

References

Sources
 Tacitus, Annals
 Suetonius, The Twelve Caesars, "Nero", & "Otho"

Ancient Roman equites
1st-century Egyptian people
1st-century Romans
66 deaths
Praetorian prefects
Members of the Pisonian conspiracy
Year of birth unknown
Rufrii
Ancient Roman exiles
People executed by the Roman Empire
Executed ancient Roman people
Poppaea Sabina